Abagrotis nefascia is a moth of the family Noctuidae first described by Smith in 1908. It is found in North America from Alberta and British Columbia down through Massachusetts to California. The species is listed as threatened in the US state of Connecticut.

Host plants
In the western U.S., larvae have been found on Amelanchier and Ribes.

References

External links

nefascia
Moths of North America
Moths described in 1908